Francesco Checcucci (born 18 March 1989) is a former Italian footballer who played as a defender.

Career
Born in Bagno a Ripoli, the Province of Florence, Checcucci started his career at Fiorentina. In 2007–08 season, he left for Prato, also located in Tuscany. In the next season, he left for Primavera under-20 team of Serie A side Chievo.

Lumezzane
In June 2009, Checcucci graduated from the Primavera team, and left for Lega Pro Prima Divisione (Italian 3rd highest level) side Lumezzane in co-ownership deal.

On 24 June 2010, Checcucci along with Fabio Pisacane were bought back by Chievo. But on 15 July 2010 he was re-signed by Lumezzane in another co-ownership deal.

Crotone
In June 2011, Checcucci returned to Verona again. However, he left for F.C. Crotone in another co-ownership deal for €210,000. On 21 June 2013 Crotone acquired Checcucci outright for free.

Parma
Checcucci was sold to Parma in July 2013 for €200,000, however on 1 August 2013 Checcucci was signed by Slovenian club ND Gorica in a temporary deal.

Savoia

In August 2014 Checcucci was signed by Savoia.

AlbinoLeffe
On 5 August 2015 he was signed by AlbinoLeffe.

References

External links
Profile at Football.it 

1989 births
Living people
People from Bagno a Ripoli
Sportspeople from the Metropolitan City of Florence
Italian footballers
Association football defenders
ACF Fiorentina players
A.C. Prato players
A.C. ChievoVerona players
F.C. Lumezzane V.G.Z. A.S.D. players
F.C. Crotone players
ND Gorica players
Parma Calcio 1913 players
A.C. Savoia 1908 players
U.C. AlbinoLeffe players
Serie B players
Serie C players
Italian expatriate footballers
Expatriate footballers in Slovenia
Italian expatriate sportspeople in Slovenia
Footballers from Tuscany